Jasper Pittard (born Jasper McMillan-Pittard, 1 April 1991) is a former Australian rules footballer who played for the North Melbourne Football Club and the Port Adelaide Football Club in the Australian Football League (AFL). He was one of 3  players drafted in the first round in the 2009 AFL Draft. Jasper is a former Fitzroy and Flemington Juniors footballer.

He is an athletic and versatile player whose kicking skills and ability to read the play can hurt the opposition.  The left-footer can also provide plenty of run from defence.  A Vic Country U18 representative in 2009, he scored 10.40 mins for the 3 km at Draft Camp, but was unable to do speed work as he was recovering from injury. He was rated by the AFL clubs as the best interviewee at the camp. He averaged 18 disposals in 13 matches for the Falcons with an efficiency rate of 71 per cent.  He also played senior football for Torquay Football Club in the Bellarine Football League in 2008.

In early 2010, Pittard decided to shorten his surname by dropping "McMillan" for simplicity.

Pittard debuted for the Power in the opening round of the 2010 NAB cup alongside seven other rookie players. Although he didn't stand out as much as some of the other debutantes, he contributed with 3 kicks and 3 handballs.

After a 25 possession match against Adelaide in round 4 he was nominated for the 2011 AFL Rising Star award.

Pittard played all 25 games in 2014 and was the team's designated kicker from the kick ins. He managed to eradicate many of the fundamental errors which had previously characterised his game. His finals series was very solid, proving his ability to perform under pressure. Pittard put together another solid year in 2015, playing 20 games.

Pittard was traded, along with teammate Jared Polec, to North Melbourne at the conclusion of the 2018 season.

Pittard played all 22 games in 2019 and finished 9th in North Melbourne's Best and Fairest for the season.

After playing the first 11 games of season 2020, Pittard was dropped from the  side along with several other teammates due to the team's poor start to the season.

Along with former teammate Tom Campbell, Pittard launched the AFL Players for Climate action initiative in 2021.

References

External links

Living people
1991 births
Australian rules footballers from Melbourne
Geelong Falcons players
Port Adelaide Football Club players
Port Adelaide Football Club players (all competitions)
Sturt Football Club players
North Melbourne Football Club players